Progressive cardiac conduction defect (PCCD) is a rare inherited degenerative disease of a heart's electrical conduction system. Over time PCCD can lead to a complete heart block and might require a pacemaker implantation to treat it.

Genetics 
Most commonly PCCD is inherited as a autosomal dominant defect and is caused by mutations of chromosome 19q13.3 and in SCN5A, SCN1B and TRPM4 genes.

References

External links 

 Familial progressive cardiac conduction defect on orpha

Congenital disorders
Heart diseases